O'Brien is an unincorporated community in Shasta County, California, United States. O'Brien has a post office with ZIP code 96070, which was established in 1945. The community is named after Con O'Brien, who had a resort in the community.

References

Unincorporated communities in California
Unincorporated communities in Shasta County, California